Washington H Soul Pattinson trading as Soul Pattison, is a publicly listed Australian investment company.

History 
In 1872, Caleb Soul and his son Washington Handley opened a pharmacy store in Pitt Street, Sydney. In 1886, Lewy Pattinson opened a pharmacy in Balmain. In April 1902, Pattinson bought Soul out with the business incorporated as Washington H Soul Pattinson & Company Limited. On 21 January 1903, the company was listed on the Sydney Stock Exchange. As well as still operating some pharmacies in Sydney, it has become a large shareholder in companies involved in building materials, mining, property investment and telecommunications. In June 2021, terms were agreed to purchase Milton Corporation.

In April 2022, WHSP sold Round Oak Minerals to Aeris Resources for A$234m ($166.5m) in a cash and stock deal.

Investments

Current
WHSP investments include:
Australian Pharmaceutical Industries (19.3%)
Brickworks Limited (43.9%)
New Hope Coal (50.0%)
TPG Telecom (12.6%)

Former
NBN Television

Chairmen
 1903–1905 Lewy Pattinson
 1906–1929 Sir Thomas Hughes
 1929-???? Lewy Pattinson
 ?
 1957–1969 William Frederick Pattinson
 1969–1999 Jim Millner
 1999–present Robert Millner

References

External links
Company website

Australian companies established in 1903
Companies based in Sydney
Companies listed on the Australian Securities Exchange
Conglomerate companies of Australia